Naëla is the debut studio album of Colombian recording artist Naëla, released on November 19, 2011. In 2009, Hernan Orjuela became in her manager. She made her debut performance in 2010 in Colombian TV Show "Sábados Felices" performing her first single No Quiero Estar Sin Ti.

Three singles has been released from the album, with "No Quiero Estar Sin Ti" becoming a success in the Spanish speaking world. The album has been promoted with several appearances on live television, and also by the Camila's Dejarte de Amar Tour in 2011 counting with a big successful.

Promotion

Singles 
 "No Quiero Estar Sin Ti" was released as Naëla' debut single on February 16, 2010, when she was only 19 years old. The song received generally favorable reviews from contemporary critics, who mostly praised its composition. "No Quiero Estar Sin Ti" was written by Naëla.
 "Muero Por Amarte"" was released as Naëla' second single on March 21, 2011. "Muero Por Amarte" was written by Naëla.
 "Esta Noche Mando Yo" " was released as Naëla' third single on September 11, 2011 featuring Obie-P. "Muero Por Amarte" was written and produced by Naëla and Obie-P.
 "Por Tu Amor" was confirmed as the fourth single of the album. It was released as Naëla's fourth single on February 16, 2012 in its solo version. The single's featuring version was released on April 22, 2012 duet with rap group Tres Coronas singer P.N.O.

Track listing

References

External links

2011 debut albums
Naëla albums
Pop rock albums
The Light Entertainment albums